Phyllobrostis farsensis is a moth in the Lyonetiidae family. It is only known from Fars in Iran.

The wingspan is about 7 mm.

External links
Revision of the genus Phyllobrostis Staudinger, 1859 (Lepidoptera, Lyonetiidae)

Lyonetiidae
Moths described in 2006